An invitational is usually a competition where players may be invited to play.

Invitational can also refer to:

Sport 
 Invitational sport

College sports 
 National Invitational Tournament, a U.S. men's college basketball tournament
 College Basketball Invitational, a U.S. men's college basketball tournament
 Maui Invitational Tournament, a U.S. college basketball tournament
 ESPN Events Invitational, a U.S. college basketball tournament

Golf 
 LIV Golf Invitational Series
 WGC Invitational, a former professional golf tournament
 Arnold Palmer Invitational, a professional golf tournament on the PGA Tour
 Memphis Invitational Open, a former professional golf tournament on the PGA Tour
 Farmers Insurance Open, formerly known as Buick Invitational of California, a U.S. professional golf tournament on the PGA Tour
 Colonial National Invitation, a U.S. professional golf tournament on the PGA Tour
 Genesis Invitational, a U.S. professional golf tournament on the PGA Tour
 Bluegrass Invitational, a former professional golf tournament on the PGA Tour from 1965 to 1974

Card games 
 Cavendish Invitational, the largest money bridge tournament in the world

Video games 
 Mid-Season Invitational, an annual League of Legends tournament
 eNASCAR iRacing Pro Invitational Series, a former series of sim racing events originally organized for NASCAR drivers

Other 
 Invitational education, an educational theory focused on developing school environment for a positive self-concept in pupils
 Invitational rhetoric, a form of rhetoric based on invitation to understanding

See also 
 Invitation (disambiguation)
 Wild card (sports), a system in sports where teams/athletes who are not formally qualified are nevertheless invited to participate